Dr. Mohammad Ahmadian (1956 - 18 October 2019) was an Iranian politician and academic who served as Deputy Head of the Atomic Energy Organization. He was also acting Head of the Organization for three weeks after Ali Akbar Salehi became Minister of Foreign Affairs. He was succeeded by Fereydoon Abbasi.

References

|-

1956 births
2019 deaths
Presidents of the Atomic Energy Organization of Iran